Alizava is a town in Panevėžys County, in central-eastern Lithuania. According to the 2011 census, the town has a population of 344 people.

References

Towns in Lithuania
Towns in Panevėžys County